Bambusa is a large genus of clumping bamboos. Most species of Bambusa are rather large, with numerous branches emerging from the nodes, and one or two much larger than the rest. The branches can be as long as 11 m (35 ft). 

They are native to Southeast Asia, South Asia, China, Taiwan, the Himalayas, New Guinea, Melanesia, and the Northern Territory of Australia. They are also reportedly naturalized in other regions, e.g. Africa, Americas, and various oceanic islands.

Species
Species
Bambusa affinis Munro – Laos, Myanmar
Bambusa albolineata L.C.Chia – Fujian, Guangdong, Jiangxi, Zhejiang
Bambusa alemtemshii H.B.Naithani – Nagaland
Bambusa amplexicaulis W.T.Lin & Z.M.Wu – Guangdong
Bambusa angustiaurita W.T.Lin – Guangdong
Bambusa angustissima L.C.Chia & H.L.Fung – Guangdong
Bambusa arnhemica F.Muell. – Northern Territory of Australia
Bambusa assamica Barooah & Borthakur – Assam
Bambusa aurinuda McClure – Guangxi, Vietnam
Bambusa australis L.C.Chia & H.L.Fung – Vietnam
Bambusa balcooa Roxb. – India, Nepal, Assam, Bangladesh, Indo-China; naturalized in South Africa and the islands of the Gulf of Guinea
Bambusa bambos (L.) Voss – India, Bangladesh, Sri Lanka, Assam, Indochina; naturalized in Seychelles, Central America, West Indies, Java, Malaysia, Maluku, Philippines
Bambusa barpatharica Borthakur & Barooah – Arunachal Pradesh, Assam
Bambusa basihirsuta McClure – Guangdong, Zhejiang
Bambusa basihirsutoides N.H.Xia – Guangdong
Bambusa basisolida W.T.Lin – Guangdong
Bambusa beecheyana Munro – Taiwan, Myanmar, Vietnam, Guangdong, Guangxi, Hainan; naturalized in Colombia, Brazil
Bambusa bicicatricata (W.T.Lin) L.C.Chia & H.L.Fung – Hainan
Bambusa binghamii Gamble – Myanmar
Bambusa blumeana Schult. & Schult. – Tropical Asia
Bambusa boniopsis McClure – Hainan
Bambusa brevispicula Holttum – New Guinea
Bambusa brunneoaciculia G.A.Fu – Hainan
Bambusa burmanica Gamble – Bangladesh, Yunnan, Myanmar, Thailand, Laos, Peninsular Malaysia
Bambusa cacharensis R.B.Majumdar – Bangladesh, Assam
Bambusa cerosissima McClure – Guangdong. Guangxi, Vietnam
Bambusa chungii McClure – Vietnam, Fujian, Guangdong, Guangxi, Hunan, Yunnan
Bambusa chunii L.C.Chia & H.L.Fung – Laos; cultivated in Hong Kong
Bambusa clavata Stapleton – Bhutan
Bambusa comillensis Alam – Bangladesh
Bambusa concava W.T.Lin – Hainan
Bambusa contracta L.C.Chia & H.L.Fung – Guangdong, Guangxi
Bambusa copelandii Gamble  – Myanmar
Bambusa corniculata L.C.Chia & H.L.Fung – Guangxi
Bambusa cornigera McClure – Guangxi
Bambusa crispiaurita W.T.Lin & Z.M.Wu – Guangdong
Bambusa dampaeana H.B.Naithani, Garbyal & N.S.Bisht – Mizoram
Bambusa diaoluoshanensis L.C.Chia & H.L.Fung – Hainan
Bambusa dissimulator McClure – Guangdong, Vietnam; naturalized in Brazil, Puerto Rico
Bambusa distegia (Keng & Keng f.) L.C.Chia & H.L.Fung – Sichuan
Bambusa dolichoclada Hayata – Fujian, Taiwan; naturalized in Ryukyu Islands
Bambusa duriuscula W.T.Lin – Hainan
Bambusa emeiensis L.C.Chia & H.L.Fung – Guizhou, Hunan, Sichuan, Yunnan
Bambusa eutuldoides McClure – Guangdong, Guangxi; naturalized in Colombia
Bambusa farinacea K.M.Wong – Thailand, Peninsular Malaysia
Bambusa fimbriligulata McClure – Myanmar
Bambusa flexuosa Munro – Cambodia, Laos, Vietnam, Guangdong, Hainan
Bambusa fruticosa Holttum – Papua New Guinea
Bambusa funghomii McClure – Henan, Guangdong, Guangxi
Bambusa garuchokua Barooah & Borthakur – Assam
Bambusa gibba McClure – Vietnam, Fujian, Guangdong, Guangxi, Hainan, Jiangxi; naturalized in Ecuador
Bambusa gibboides W.T.Lin – Guangdong
Bambusa glabrovagina G.A.Fu – Hainan
Bambusa glaucophylla Widjaja – Java
Bambusa grandis (Q.H.Dai & X.L.Tao) Ohrnb. – Guangxi
Bambusa griffithiana Munro – Manipur, Myanmar
Bambusa guangxiensis L.C.Chia & H.L.Fung – Guangxi
Bambusa hainanensis L.C.Chia & H.L.Fung – Hainan
Bambusa heterostachya (Munro) Holttum – Peninsular Malaysia
Bambusa horsfieldii Munro – Java, Philippines
Bambusa indigena L.C.Chia & H.L.Fung – Guangdong
Bambusa insularis L.C.Chia & H.L.Fung – Hainan
Bambusa intermedia Hsueh f. & T.P.Yi – Guizhou, Sichuan, Yunnan
Bambusa jacobsii Widjaja – Java
Bambusa jaintiana R.B.Majumdar  – Nepal, Bhutan, Assam, Arunachal Pradesh, Myanmar
Bambusa khasiana Munro – Assam
Bambusa kingiana Gamble – Myanmar
Bambusa lako Widjaja – Timor
Bambusa lapidea McClure – Guangdong, Guangxi, Sichuan, Yunnan
Bambusa latideltata W.T.Lin – Guangdong
Bambusa laxa K.M.Wong – Peninsular Malaysia
Bambusa lenta L.C.Chia – Fujian
Bambusa longipalea W.T.Lin – Guangdong
Bambusa longispiculata Gamble – Bangladesh, Myanmar; naturalized in Vietnam, Costa Rica, Honduras, Nicaragua, Colombia, Ecuador, Puerto Rico
†Bambusa lugdunensis Saporta – Neogene deposits of Europe
Bambusa macrolemma Holttum – New Britain
Bambusa macrotis L.C.Chia & H.L.Fung – Guangdong
Bambusa maculata Widjaja – Maluku
Bambusa majumdarii P.Kumari & P.Singh – Meghalaya
Bambusa malingensis McClure – Hainan; naturalized in Cuba
Bambusa manipureana H.B.Naithani & N.S.Bisht – Manipur
Bambusa marginata Munro – Myanmar
Bambusa merrillii Gamble – Luzon
Bambusa microcephala (Pilg.) Holttum – New Guinea
Bambusa mizorameana H.B.Naithani – Mizoram
Bambusa mohanramii P.Kumari & P.Singh – Meghalaya
Bambusa mollis L.C.Chia & H.L.Fung – Guangxi
Bambusa multiplex (Lour.) Raeusch. ex Schult.f. – Nepal, Bhutan, Assam, Laos, Myanmar, Vietnam, Guangdong, Guangxi, Hainan, Hunan, Jiangxi, Sichuan, Taiwan, Yunnan; naturalized in Madagascar, Mauritius, Seychelles, Iraq, Bismarck Archipelago, New Zealand, Chiapas, Central America, West Indies, Colombia, Ecuador, eastern Brazil, Florida, Georgia, Alabama 
Bambusa mutabilis McClure – Hainan; naturalized in Puerto Rico
Bambusa nagalandiana H.B.Naithani – Nagaland
Bambusa nairiana P.Kumari & P.Singh – Meghalaya
Bambusa nepalensis Stapleton – Nepal
Bambusa nutans Wall. ex Munro – Himalayas of eastern + northern India; Nepal, Bhutan, Bangladesh, Laos, Thailand, Vietnam
Bambusa odashimae Hatus. ex D.Z.Li & Stapleton – Taiwan; naturalized in Ryukyu Islands
Bambusa oldhamii Munro – Fujian, Guangdong, Guangxi, Hainan, Taiwan, Zhejiang; naturalized in Taiwan, Ryukyu Islands, New Zealand, Chiapas, Honduras, Puerto Rico, Colombia, Ecuador, Peru
Bambusa oliveriana Gamble – Myanmar
Bambusa ooh Widjaja & Astuti – Bali
Bambusa pachinensis Hayata – Fujian, Guangdong, Guangxi, Jiangxi, Taiwan, Zhejiang
Bambusa pallida Munro – Sikkim, Yunnan, Assam, Bangladesh, Arunachal Pradesh, Indochina
Bambusa papillata (Q.H.Dai) K.M.Lan – Guangxi
Bambusa papillatoides Q.H.Dai & D.Y.Huang – Guangxi
Bambusa pervariabilis McClure – Guangdong, Guangxi; naturalized in  Puerto Rico
Bambusa pierreana E.G.Camus – Thailand, Vietnam
Bambusa piscatorum McClure – Hainan
Bambusa polymorpha Munro – Bangladesh, Laos, Myanmar, Thailand; naturalized in  Assam, Sri Lanka, Java, Cuba, Puerto Rico, Ecuador
Bambusa procera A.Chev. & A.Camus – Vietnam, Cambodia
Bambusa prominens H.L.Fung & C.Y.Sia – Sichuan
Bambusa ramispinosa L.C.Chia & H.L.Fung – Guangxi
Bambusa rangaensis Borthakur & Barooah – Arunachal Pradesh, Assam
Bambusa rectocuneata (W.T.Lin) N.H.Xia, R.S.Lin & R.H.Wang – Guangdong
Bambusa remotiflora (Kuntze) L.C.Chia & H.L.Fung – Guangdong, Guangxi, Vietnam
Bambusa riauensis Widjaja – Sumatra
Bambusa rigida Keng & Keng f. – Sichuan
Bambusa riparia Holttum – Papua New Guinea
Bambusa rongchengensis (T.P.Yi & C.Y.Sia) D.Z.Li – Sichuan
Bambusa rugata (W.T.Lin) Ohrnb. – Guangdong
Bambusa rutila McClure – Fujian, Guangdong, Guangxi, Sichuan
Bambusa salarkhanii Alam – Nepal, Bangladesh
Bambusa schizostachyoides Kurz ex Gamble – Myanmar, Vietnam, Andaman Islands
Bambusa semitecta W.T.Lin & Z.M.Wu – Guangdong
Bambusa sesquiflora (McClure) L.C.Chia & H.L.Fung – Thailand, Vietnam
Bambusa sinospinosa McClure – Guangdong, Guangxi, Hainan
Bambusa solida Munro ex Becc. – Borneo
Bambusa solomonensis Holttum – Solomon Islands
Bambusa spinosa Roxb. – Indonesia, Philippines; naturalized in southern China, Ryukyu Islands, Indochina, Malaysia, Puerto Rico
Bambusa stenoaurita (W.T.Lin) T.H.Wen – Guangdong
Bambusa subaequalis H.L.Fung & C.Y.Sia – Sichuan
Bambusa subtruncata L.C.Chia & H.L.Fung – Guangdong
Bambusa surrecta (Q.H.Dai) Q.H.Dai – Guangxi
Bambusa tabacaria (Lour.) Steud. – Vietnam, Java, Maluku
Bambusa teres Munro – Tibet, Guangdong, Guangxi, Nepal, Bangladesh, Bhutan, Assam, Myanmar
Bambusa textilis McClure – Anhui, Guangdong, Guangxi, Vietnam; naturalized in Colombia, Puerto Rico
Bambusa transvenula (W.T.Lin & Z.J.Feng) N.H.Xia – Guangdong
Bambusa truncata B.M.Yang – Hunan
Bambusa tsangii McClure – Vietnam
Bambusa tulda Roxb – Tibet, Yunnan, Himalayas, Nepal, Bhutan, Assam, India, Bangladesh, northern Indochina; naturalized in Iraq, Ecuador, Brazil, Colombia, Puerto Rico
Bambusa tuldoides Munro – Guangdong, Guangxi, Indochina; naturalized in Ryukyu Islands, Bangladesh, Chiapas, El Salvador, Cuba, Puerto Rico, Hispaniola, Trinidad, Ecuador, Brazil, Colombia
Bambusa utilis W.C.Lin – Taiwan
Bambusa valida (Q.H.Dai) W.T.Lin – Guangxi
Bambusa variostriata (W.T.Lin) L.C.Chia & H.L.Fung – Guangdong
Bambusa ventricosa McClure – Guangdong, Vietnam; naturalized in Brazil, Malaysia
Bambusa villosula Kurz – Myanmar
Bambusa vinhphuensis T.Q.Nguyen – Vietnam
Bambusa viridis Widjaja – western New Guinea
Bambusa vulgaris Schrad.  – Yunnan, Indochina; naturalized in parts of Africa, Madagascar, Malaysia, Indonesia, New Guinea, Indian Subcontinent, Latin America, West Indies, United States (Hawaii, Puerto Rico, Florida, Arizona, South Carolina, Maryland, New Jersey)
Bambusa wenchouensis (T.H.Wen) Keng f. ex Q.F.Zheng, Y.M.Lin – Fujian, Zhejiang
Bambusa xiashanensis L.C.Chia & H.L.Fung – Guangdong
Bambusa xueana Ohrnb. – Yunnan

Fossil record
Fossil leaves of †Bambusa ilinskiae are described from the Miocene deposits of the Carpathians. The fossil leaves of †Bambusa lugdunensis are known mainly from the Miocene of the Massif du Coiron in Ardèche, France, Miocene of Bełchatów in Poland, Middle Miocene of Austria, the Neogene of the Transcarpathians and the Pliocene of southern France. Findings of fossil Bambusa leaf impressions of Messinian age (ca. 5.7 Ma) from Monte Tondo in the Romagna Apennines in northern Italy, are similar to fossil †Bambusa lugdunensis leaves.

See also
Domesticated plants and animals of Austronesia

References

 
Bambusoideae genera
Bamboo